This is a list of vice presidents in 2018.

Africa
  Vice President - Bornito de Sousa (2017–present)
  Vice President –
Mokgweetsi Masisi (2014–2018)
Slumber Tsogwane (2018–present)
 
First Vice President – Gaston Sindimwo (2015–2020)
Second Vice President - Joseph Butore (2015–2020)
  - Vice Presidents - Djaffar Ahnwd Said Hassani ( Vice President in charge of the Ministry of Economy, Planning, Industry, Crafts, Investments, Private Sector and Land Affairs) (2016–2018), - Moustadroine Abdou (Vice President in Charge of the Ministry of Agriculture, Fishing, Environment, Spatial Planning and Urbanism) (2016–2018), Abdallah Said Sarouma (Vice President in Charge of the Minister of Transport, Posts and Telecommunication and Information and Communication Technology) (2016–2018)
 Vice President -  Teodoro Nguema Obiang Mangue (2016–2018)
 Vice President -  Pierre-Claver Maganga Moussavou (2017–2019)
  Vice President -
Fatoumata Tambajang (2017–2018)
Ousainou Darboe (2018–2019)
  Vice President  - Mahamudu Bawumia (2017–present)
  Vice President - Daniel Kablan Duncan (2017–2020)
  Deputy President - William Ruto (2012–present)
  Vice President - 
Joseph Boakai (2006–2018)
Jewel Taylor (2018–present)
Libya
  Government of National Accord of Libya  (Interim government internationally recognized as the sole legitimate government of Libya from 12 March 2016) - Vice Presidents of the Presidential Council of Libya (Tripoli) - Fathi Al-Majbari (2016–2018), Abdulsalam Kajman (2016–2021), Ahmed Maiteeq (2016–2021), Ali Faraj Qatrani (2016–2019)
 'Government of House of Representatives of Libya' (Government of Libya internationally recognized to 12 March 2016) Deputy presidents of the House of Representatives of Libya -  Imhemed Shaib (2014–2021).  Ahmed Huma (2014–2021)
  Vice President - Saulos Chilima (2014–2019)
  Vice President – Barlen Vyapoory (2016–2019)
  Vice President -
Nicky Iyambo (2015–2018)
Nangolo Mbumba (2018–present)
  Vice President - Yemi Osinbajo (2015–present)
  Vice President - Vincent Meriton (2016–2020)
  Vice President -
Victor Bockarie Foh (2015–2018)
Mohamed Juldeh Jalloh (2018–present)
  Vice President - Abdirahman Saylici (2010–present)
  Deputy President -
Cyril Ramaphosa (2014–2018)
David Mabuza (2018–present)
 
First Vice President - Taban Deng Gai (2016–2020)
Vice President - James Wani Igga (2016–2020)
 
First Vice President – Bakri Hassan Saleh (2013–2019)
Second Vice President -
Hassabu Mohamed Abdalrahman (2013–2018)
Osman Kebir (2018–2019)
  Vice President - Samia Suluhu (2015–2021)
 
First Vice President – Seif Sharif Hamad (2010–2019)
Second Vice President – Seif Ali Iddi (2010–2020)
  Vice President - Edward Ssekandi (2011–2021)
  Vice President - Inonge Wina (2015–2021)
 
First Vice Presidents –  Constantino Chiwenga (2017–present)
Second Vice President – Kembo Mohadi (2017–2021)

Asia
  Vice President - Vitali Gabnia (2014–2018)
 
First Vice President - Abdul Rashid Dostum (2014–2020)
Second Vice President - Sarwar Danish (2014–2021)
  Vice President - Mehriban Aliyeva (2017–present)
  Vice President - 
Li Yuanchao (2013–2018)
Wang Qishan (2018–present) 
  Vice President -Venkaiah Naidu (2017–present)
  Vice President - Jusuf Kalla (2014–2019)
 
First Vice President - Eshaq Jahangiri (2013–2021)
Others Vice Presidents -  Mohammad Nahavandian (Vice President for Economic Affairs)  (2017–2021), Mohammad Bagher Nobakht  (Vice President and Head of Management and Planning Organization) (2016–2021), Laya Joneidi (Vice President for Legal Affairs) (2017–2021), Hossein-Ali Amiri (Vice President for Parliamentary Affairs) (2017–2021), Sorena Sattari (Vice President for Science and Technology Affaires) (2013–present),  Masoumeh Ebtekar (Vice President for Women's and Family Affairs) (2017–2021), Ali Asghar Mounesan (Vice President of Cultural Heritage and Tourism Organization) (2017–2019), Ali Akbar Salehi (Vice President and Head of Atomic Energy Organization) (2013–2021), Mohammad-Ali Shahidi (Vice President and Head of Martyrs and Self-sacrifice's Affairs Foundation) (2016–2020). Jamshid Ansari (Vice President and Head of Administrative and Recruitment Organization) (2016–2021), Isa Kalantari (Vice President and Head of Environmental Protection Organization) (2017–2021)
  Vice Presidents - Nouri al-Maliki (2016–2018), Usama al-Nujayfi (2016–2018), Ayad Allawi (2016–2018)
  Vice President- vacant (2017–2019)
 
Vice presidents de facto - Vice Chairmen of State Affairs Commission - Choe Ryong-hae (2016–present), Pak Pong-ju (2016–2021), Hwang Pyong-so (2016–2018)
Vice presidents de jure - Vice Chairmen of the Presidium of Supreme People's Assembly - Kim Yong-dae (2009–present), Yang Hyong-sop (1998–2019), Choe Yong-rim (honorary) (2011–2019), Kim Yong-ju (honorary) (1998–2019)
  Vice President – Phankham Viphavanh (2016–2021)
  Vice President –
Abdulla Jihad (2016–2018)
Faisal Naseem (2018–present)
 
First Vice President – Myint Swe (2016–2021)
Second Vice President – Henry Van Thio (2016–present)
  Vice President - Nanda Bahadur Pun (2015–present)
  Vice President – Leni Robredo (2016–present)
Syria
 Vice President – Najah al-Attar ((2006–present))

First Vice President –
Abdulrahman Mustafa, (2017–2018)
Abdul Basset Hamou, (2018–2019)
Second Vice President –
Salwa Ktaw (2017–2018)
Badr Jamous (2018–2019)
Third Vice President – Dima Moussa (2018–2020)
 Vice President – Chen Chien-jen (2016–2020)
 Vice President – Fuat Oktay (2018–present)
 Vice President – Sheikh Mohammed bin Rashid Al Maktoum (2006–present)
 Vice President – Đặng Thị Ngọc Thịnh (2016–2021)
Yemen
 Vice President – Ali Mohsen al-Ahmar (2016–present)

Europe
  Vice President - Iliana Iotova  (2017–present)
  Vice President - Vacant (1974–present)
  Vice President - Ueli Maurer (2018)

North America and the Caribbean
 
First Vice President -
Helio Fallas (2014–2018)
Epsy Campbell Barr (2018–present)
Second Vice President -
Ana Helena Chacón (2014–2018)
Marvin Rodríguez Cordero (2018–present)
 
First Vice President of Council of State -
Miguel Díaz-Canel (2013–2018)
Salvador Valdés Mesa (2018–2019)
Others Vice Presidents of Council of State - Gladys María Bejerano Portela (2013–2019), Mercedes Lopez Acea (2013–2918), Roberto Tomás Morales Ojeda (2018–2019), Jose Ramon Machado Ventura (2013–2918), Inés María Chapman (2018–2019), Ramiro Valdes Menendez (2009–2019), Salvador Valdes Mesa (2013–2019), Beatriz Jhonson (2018–2019)
  Vice President - Margarita Cedeño de Fernández (2012–2020)
  Vice President - Óscar Ortiz (2014–2019)
  Vice President – Jafeth Cabrera (2016–2020)
 
First Vice President - Ricardo Antonio Alvarez Arias (2014–2022)
Second Vice President -
Ana Rossana Guevara Pinto (2014–2018)
Olga Margarita Alvarado Rodríguez (2018–2022)
Third Vice President -
Lorena Enriqueta Herrera Estevez (2014–2018)
María Antonia Rivera Rosales (2018–2022)
  Vice President - Rosario Murillo (2017–present)
  Vice President - Isabel Saint Malo (2014–2019)
  Vice President - Mike Pence (2017–2021)

Oceania
  Vice President – Kourabi Nenem (2016–2019)
  Vice President - Yosiwo P. George (2015–present)
  Vice President - Raynold Oilouch - (2017–present)
  
Member of Council of Deputies –  vacant (2017–present)
Member of Council of Deputies –  Tuiloma Pule Lameko (2016–2018)
Member of Council of Deputies –  Le Mamea Ropati (2016–present)

South America
  Vice President - Gabriela Michetti (2015–2019)
  Vice President - Álvaro García Linera (2006–2019)
  Vice President –  vacant (2016–2018)
  Vice President -
Óscar Naranjo (2017–2018)
Marta Lucía Ramírez (2018–present)
  Vice President -
Jorge Glas (2013–2018)
María Vicuña (2017–2018)
José Augusto Briones (acting) (2018)
Otto Sonnenholzner (2018–2020)
 
First Vice President - Moses Nagamootoo (2015–2020)
Second Vice President - Khemraj Ramjattan (2015–2020)
Third Vice President - Carl Greenidge (2015–2019)
Fourth Vice President - Sydney Allicock (2015–2020)
  Vice President -
Juan Afara (2013–2018)
Alicia Pucheta (2018)
Hugo Velázquez Moreno (2018–present)
 
First Vice President -
Mercedes Aráoz (2018–2020)
Martín Vizcarra (2016–2018)
Second Vice President - Mercedes Aráoz (2016–2018)
  Vice President - Ashwin Adhin (2015–2020)
  Vice President -  Lucía Topolansky (2017–2020)
  Vice President -
Tareck El Aissami (2017–2018)
Delcy Rodríguez (2018–present)

See also
List of current vice presidents and designated acting presidents

References

External links
World Leaders CIA

Lists of vice presidents